Grand Veneur de Brabant or Grand Huntsman of Brabant was a feudal function at the court of the Duchy of Brabant.

History 
Like other functions at the court, this was an exclusive position for certain noble houses. In the 16th, 17th and 18th centuries the function was inherited by the Lords of Rubempré, and passed to the Merode family. Similar functions have been the Panetarius and Grand Falconer of Brabant, Grand Forester of Brabant and High Forester of Flanders.

List

References

See also 
Broodmeester of Flanders

 
Nobility of the Duchy of Brabant